Tucker Nichols (born May 14, 1970) is an American artist. His artwork includes drawings, paintings, sculptures, books, in-gallery cinema and performance spaces and large scale works on walls and storefront windows. He has a BA from Brown University and an MA from Yale University, both in the history of Chinese Painting. He lives near San Francisco.

Projects
Tucker Nichols' work has been featured at the Drawing Center in New York, Den Frie Museum in Copenhagen, The Denver Art Museum, and the San Francisco Museum of Modern Art, the Contemporary Jewish Museum, and the Asian Art Museum of San Francisco.

Nichols' drawings have been published in McSweeney's, J&L Books, The Thing Quarterly, Nieves Books, and the op-ed pages of The New York Times. Crabtree, a children's book by Jon and Tucker Nichols, was published by McSweeney's in 2013. This Bridge Will Not Be Gray, a book by Dave Eggers and Tucker Nichols, was published by McSweeney's in 2015.

Stage Presence, Theatricality in Art and Media in 2012, a multimedia in-gallery cinema and performance space at the SF MOMA.

Flowers for Sick People, a multimedia project in 2021, in which he creates flowers and then mails them across the world is featured at the SF MOMA.

He is represented by Zieher Smith & Horton in New York and Gallery 16 in San Francisco.

Exhibitions 
SFMOMA, San Francisco, Close to Home, Creativity in Crisis. 6 March - 5 September 2021.

References

External links
 
 Anonymous Postcard

1970 births
American artists
Brown University alumni
The New Yorker people
Yale University alumni
Living people